Maulvi Nooruddin Umair is an Afghan Taliban politician who is currently serving as Deputy Minister of Finance and Administration at Ministry of Public Works since 14 March 2022. Umair has also served as Governor of Takhar Province from late 2021 to 14 March 2022.

References

Living people
Governors of Takhar Province
Taliban governors
Year of birth missing (living people)